The Eccentric Club is the name of several London gentlemen's clubs, the best-known of which existed between 1890 and 1986. For much of its history it was based at 9–11 Ryder Street, St James's. The current Club was founded in 2008.

First Eccentric Club
The first Eccentric Club had its roots in the Society of Eccentrics which existed from 1781 to the 1820s. They were an offshoot of The Brilliants and were described as a convivial Club who met at a tavern in Chandos Street, Covent Garden. They were later renamed into The Eccentric Society Club, meeting at Tom Ree's in May's Building, St Martin's Lane, as well as several other addresses around Covent Garden until the club was finally dissolved in 1846.

At May's Building they 'flourished at all hours' and among their members were many celebrities of the literary and political world; they were always treated with indulgence by the authorities. An inaugural ceremony was performed upon the making of a member, which terminated with a jubilation from the president. The books of the club, up to the time of its removal from May's Buildings, are stated to have passed into the possession of Robert Lloyd, a hatter of The Strand who was well known in his day as a writer, inventor and keen appreciator of philosophy.

From 1781 through to 1846, the Eccentrics numbered upward of some 40,000 members, many of them holding high social position, such as Charles James Fox, Richard Brinsley Sheridan, Lord Melbourne and Lord Brougham. On the same memorable night that Sheridan and Lord Petersham were admitted, Theodore Hook was also enrolled; and through this Club membership, he is believed to have obtained some of his high connections. In a novel published in numbers, F. W. N. Bayley sketched with graphic vigour the meetings of 'The Eccentrics' at the old tavern in May's Buildings.

Second Eccentric Club
A second Eccentric Club, considered to be unrelated, was founded in 1858, and disbanded in 1881. It existed in the Leicester Square area.

Third Eccentric Club

The third and longest-lived Eccentric Club was established by the theatrical costumier Jack Harrison on 21 November 1890 and disbanded in 1986. Immediately upon its foundation, it occupied the old premises of the Pelican Club in Denman Street, Soho. In 1893 it moved to 21 Shaftesbury Avenue. In 1914, the club moved to the former Dieudonné's Hotel at 9–11 Ryder Street, where it remained until its closure.

The club adopted the night-owl as its symbol. It was noted for the generosity of its members, who raised £25,000 for limbless soldiers during World War I, and every Christmas, Westminster's poor would queue up outside the Eccentric club for free meals.

Like many London clubs, it went through a period of financial hardship in the 1970s. The club closed its doors in 1984, ostensibly for a period of renovation, but was forced into liquidation in 1986.

In 1985, many of the club's membership were elected to the East India Club, where some of them continue to meet occasionally to this day in the American Bar which has a backward-running clock (a replica of the original which was once at the Eccentric Club). This is in keeping with numerous other London clubs of the nineteenth century which have lost their premises, but continue to meet as a society in an existing club; other examples include the Authors' Club and Savage Club now meeting in the National Liberal Club, the Portland Club meeting in the Savile Club, and the Canning Club now meeting in the Naval and Military Club. However, a considerable number of members refused to join the East India Club and instead joined the Royal Automobile Club and the Oxford and Cambridge Club; almost all members of the Eccentric Golfing Society went to the Ealing Golf Club.

Notable members
The third Eccentric Club's members included
Ernest Berry Webber
Henry Ainley
Sir George Alexander, actor
Viscount Burnham
Joe Davis
Alfredo Leonardo Edel
Sir Walter de Frece
Jimmy Glover, musician 
Edward Douglas-Scott-Montagu
Sir Gerald du Maurier
Bud Flanagan
Dudley Hardy
Sir Augustus Harris
Sir Seymour Hicks
Dan Leno
The Earl of Lonsdale
Sir James Miller
H. Montague-Bates
Lord Montagu
M. De Paleologue
Prince Philip, Duke of Edinburgh (patron, 1980–1986 and 2008– )
George Robey
George Robert Sims
F. E. Smith
Sir Herbert Tree
Sir Frederick Wells
Sir Henry Wood
Sir Charles Wyndham

Current club
A number of members of the old Club and some new enthusiasts from other London clubs, with a blessing of Lord Montagu, the last President of the old club, in August 2008 founded the Eccentric Club UK. In November 2008, the Club successfully secured the patronage of Prince Philip, Duke of Edinburgh, who was a Patron of the Eccentric Club between 1980 and 1986. Prince Philip has since dined twice with the club.

The refounded club now has regular meetings at the Savile Club and the Oriental Club and has recently resumed its traditional annual activities, including a snooker match and cricket match with the Savile Club. The revived club has registered the words "Eccentric Club", "Nil Nisi Bonum" and the old club logo as own trademarks.

Continuity between the clubs
Its committee claims to be able to prove continuity between the earlier Eccentric Clubs, and thus, claims a foundation date of 1781, although the Committee of the disbanded club and a number of authors claimed a foundation date of 1890.

On the other hand, a number of Victorian and Edwardian books and newspapers discussing the Eccentric Club in 1890 referred to the earlier Eccentric Clubs in London. In the only recorded interview with J.A.Harrison of the time, he also admits that the club is not new, although brought back in a new form and hence – established on 21 November 1890.

At the Third Anniversary Dinner in 1893, J.A.Harrison "traced back its origin to the Eccentric Club of 1800, which included Sheridan Knowles... Mr Harrison explained that the white owl was the crest of the old club, and had been adopted by the present one". Before the Second World War, a list of most treasured possessions of the Eccentric Club included the Ancient Book of the Eccentric Society presented to the club by S.J.Pallant. Similarly, there are references by Sir Charles Wyndham and other founding members to the earlier club they were reviving.

The Eccentric Club UK, founded in 2008 and claiming to maintain the traditions since 1781, is conducting an in-depth research of the Eccentric Club's history. Its Committee managed to uncover many previously thought lost records and documents related to the 1780s–1860s and the 1890s–1940s. The last President of the old Eccentric Club, disbanded in 1986, Lord Montagu of Beaulieu, has entrusted his personal archive of documents related to the old club to the committee.

See also
List of gentlemen's clubs in London

References

External links
Website of the newly 'refounded' Eccentric Club
Website of the East India Club, which many members of the Eccentric Club joined

Gentlemen's clubs in London
1781 establishments in England
1858 establishments in England
1890 establishments in England
2008 in London
2008 establishments in England